Jafarabad-e Sofla (also Romanized as Ja‘farābād-e Soflá; also known as Ja‘farābād-e Pā’īn, Ja‘farābād-e Seyyed, and Ja‘farābad Payin) is a village in Baghestan Rural District, in the Central District of Bavanat County, Fars Province, Iran. At the 2006 census, its population was 156, in 35 families.

References 

Populated places in Bavanat County